Arthur Seat  1672 m (5486 ft) prominence 407 m, is a mountain in the Clear Range of the Southern Interior of British Columbia, Canada, located across the Thompson River from the settlement of Spences Bridge.

Name origin
The name was inspired by Arthur's Seat overlooking Edinburgh, Scotland, by one of Spences Bridge's pre-eminent pioneers, John Murray.

References

Interior Plateau
Thompson Country
One-thousanders of British Columbia
Kamloops Division Yale Land District